The Blue and White is a magazine written by undergraduates at Columbia University, New York City. Founded in 1890, the magazine has dedicated itself throughout its existence to providing students an outlet for intellectual and political discussion, literary publication, and general parody.

History
Founded in 1890, the magazine disbanded for unknown reasons in 1893.  It was not until 1998 that a handful of undergraduates revived the journal based on the original format.  The staff has since grown to several dozen writers and contributors.  In switching to a monthly in 2005, the magazine affirmed its place as a campus fixture. Recently, the magazine has begun to focus more on pieces of "hard" journalism, in contradistinction to its former, less serious, and more literary character. The Blue and White staff meets in the crypt of St. Paul's Chapel.

Bwog

In 2006, The Blue and White established Bwog, an online blog counterpart to the magazine. Bwog aims to bring its readership gossip and other Columbia news around the clock. It first gained national recognition for its coverage of a violent protest against the Minutemen illegal immigration group that occurred at Columbia in 2006 and for Iranian President Mahmoud Ahmadinejad's controversial visit to the university in 2007. Years later, in December 2010, Bwog gained national media attention again for its reactive coverage of Operation Ivy League, a notorious campus drug bust.

Past editors
Claire Shang
Dominy Gallo
Sam Needleman
Ufon Umanah
Caroline Hurley
Alex Swanson
Channing Prend
Hallie Swanson
Torsten Odland
Conor Skelding
Brian Wagner
Mark Hay
Liz Naiden
Jon Hill
Juli Weiner

Alumni

Christopher Beam, writer for Slate
Michael Yates Crowley, playwright
Telis Demos, writer for the Wall Street Journal
Franklin Foer (Honorary), Editor of the New Republic
Kate Linthicum, writer for the Los Angeles Times
Anna Phillips, writer for The New York Times''' School Book
Dave Plotz, Senior Editor at Bloggingheads.tv
Marc Tracy, staff writer at The New York TimesJuli Weiner, blogger for Vanity FairGideon Yago, correspondent for MTV News
Avi Zenilman, executive editor for The National Memo''

References

External links
The Blue and White
The Blue and White on WikiCU
Bwog
Mention in The New Yorker
Blue & White magazine at UNC-Chapel Hill

Columbia University publications
Magazines established in 1890
Magazines published in New York City
Monthly magazines published in the United States
Student magazines published in the United States